Margaret Erskine (31 July 1925 – 21 May 2006) was a British athlete. She competed in the women's long jump at the 1948 Summer Olympics.

References

1925 births
2006 deaths
Athletes (track and field) at the 1948 Summer Olympics
British female long jumpers
Olympic athletes of Great Britain
Place of birth missing